Giovanni Sottocornola (1855–1917) was an Italian painter.

Biography
He was born in Milan of humble origins. In 1875 he enrolled at the Brera Academy of Fine Arts, where he attended the courses of Raffaele Casnedi and Giuseppe Bertini until 1880 and met his fellow students Gaetano Previati, Emilio Longoni and Giovanni Segantini. While the portraits and still lifes presented at the Brera exhibitions of the following years enjoyed considerable success on the art market, he began to address social themes early in the new decade and experimented with the Divisionist technique in paintings like The Worker’s Dawn (1897, Galleria d’Arte Moderna, Milan). Later years saw a return to portraiture as well as genre scenes inspired by family feeling and landscapes painted during stays in the pre-Alpine area of Lombardy. A participant in Milanese and Venetian exhibitions, he combined teaching and restoration with painting.

In 1886 at Milan, he exhibited a canvas titled The Fruit or Venditrice di zucche, and a portrait. In 1887 in Venice, he exhibited a Dilettante; Una pagina comica. At the 1891 Mostra triennale di Brera, he exhibited Un muratore, Effect of a grey and drizzly time; and Fuori porta. The first is a scene in Porte Garibaldi in Milan. Sottocornola also painted still lifes, landscapes, and portraits.

References
 Laura Casone, Giovanni Sottocornola , online catalogue Artgate by Fondazione Cariplo, 2010, CC BY-SA (source for the first revision of this article).

Other projects

1855 births
1917 deaths
19th-century Italian painters
Italian male painters
20th-century Italian painters
Italian genre painters
Painters from Milan
Divisionist painters
Brera Academy alumni
19th-century Italian male artists
20th-century Italian male artists